"Monsters" is a song by rock band All Time Low featuring Blackbear and Demi Lovato. The song was written by FRND, Kevin Fisher, Jack Barakat, Alex Gaskarth, Blackbear and Demi Lovato, and produced by Zakk Cervini and Gaskarth. The song was originally released on April 3, 2020, by Fueled by Ramen, as part of the band's eighth studio album Wake Up, Sunshine. Following 11 weeks at number one on Billboards Alternative Airplay chart, the song was re-released with vocals by Demi Lovato on December 4, 2020. It debuted on the Billboard Hot 100 at number 88 and peaked at number 55.

Background 
All Time Low, Lovato, and Blackbear teased the collaboration on social media prior to release, all sharing similar artwork, which led fans to believe a collaboration was underway. The next day, the band confirmed the collaboration, specifically that Lovato would be featuring on a re-release of "Monsters", to be released that night.

Speaking to People, Gaskarth said Lovato was recruited for a re-release of the track because she had been a "friend for over ten years" and "genuinely has one of the best voices in modern music and always sounds authentic and incredible singing any genre, particularly when she's leaning into rock or punk." Meanwhile, Lovato shared on Twitter that she was "stoked" to be on a song with both All Time Low and Blackbear.

Former Neck Deep bassist-turned-DJ Fil Thorpe-Evans, commonly known as Prblm Child, created an electronic remix of the song. It was released as "Monsters: Prblm Child Remix." A distorted version of the chorus behind loud bass drops is heard after the main chorus.

Composition
The song’s overall sound has been described as pop-punk, alternative pop, electronic rock, and rap rock by critics, while also being compared to Fall Out Boy.

Chart performance 
The song is All Time Low's first number one on the Billboard Alternative Airplay chart, reaching the summit in September 2020 and remaining there for 18 weeks. As of January 2022, the song holds the record for the longest continuous run on the respective chart with 88 weeks. "Monsters" is the band's highest-charting song of their career on the Billboard Hot 100, as well as their highest peak on pop radio.

Lyric videos 
Lyric videos were released for the song, with cartoon illustrations of the All Time Low band members and Blackbear running away from monstrous figures. After the release of the Demi Lovato version, a new lyric video was uploaded, where an animation representing Lovato is included in the lyric video as well, coordinated with when she sings her verses of the song. Lovato's character is also seen singing on stage backed by the band comprising monsters.

Track listing 
Digital download and streaming

 "Monsters" – 2:54
 "Monsters" (Demi Lovato remix) – 2:54

Personnel 
Credits adapted from Tidal.

All Time Low
 Alex Gaskarth – lead vocals
 Jack Barakat – guitars, backing vocals
 Zack Merrick – bass, backing vocals
 Rian Dawson – drums, percussion

Additional musicians
 Blackbear – vocals
 Demi Lovato – vocals

Technical
 Zakk Cervini – producer, engineering, additional production
 Andrew Goldstein – producer, additional production
 Mitch Allan – vocal production (Demi Lovato re-release)
 Demi Lovato – vocal production (Demi Lovato re-release)
 Alex Ghenea – mixing (Demi Lovato re-release)
 Neal Avron – mixing (album version)
 Andrew Cook – artwork
 Chris Gehringer – mastering (Demi Lovato re-release)
 Ted Jensen – mastering (album version)

Charts

Weekly charts

Year-end charts

Certifications

References 

2020 singles
2020 songs
All Time Low songs
Demi Lovato songs
Blackbear (musician) songs
Fueled by Ramen singles
Animated music videos
Songs written by Andrew Goldstein (musician)
Songs written by Alex Gaskarth
Songs written by Demi Lovato
Songs written by Jack Barakat
Songs written by Blackbear (musician)